G-code is a programming language for numerical control.

G-code or G code may also refer to:

 Video recorder scheduling code, a video recorder programming system.
 Code of the streets, a code of conduct for those in the inner city.
 Tha G-Code, a 1999 album by rapper Juvenile.
 G-Code, a song by Geto Boys in their 2005 album The Foundation.
 G Code, a 2008 album by Korean rapper Eun Ji Won.
 a specific instance of the Bell 206B Jet Ranger III helicopter.
 certain codes used in non-uniform rational B-spline (NURBS) modeling.
 a code used in the U.S. medical billing industry with reference to the status of electronic prescribing, for Medicare reimbursement purposes.
 "G Code", a song by hip hop artist Kendrick Lamar present in his mixtape C4